Náchod District(German: Bezirk Nachod) is a district (okres) within Hradec Králové Region of the Czech Republic. Its administrative center is the town of Náchod.

Tourism
In the territory of Náchod District is the Kladsko Borderland Tourist Area (tourism district), formerly known as the Jirásek's Region: Adršpach-Teplice Rocks.

Transport
A section of European route E67 passes through the district, between Hradec Králové and Náchod. This provides a direct road link to the city of Prague in one direction and the countries of Poland, Lithuania, Latvia and Estonia in the other. Railway transport is less important, because Náchod is far from the main railway corridor and remote trains do not go there (remote trains to Prague stay in Červený Kostelec and Starkoč). Railway and road connections with the east and southeast Czech Republic are also very bad.

List of municipalities

 Adršpach 
 Bezděkov nad Metují 
 Bohuslavice 
 Borová 
 Božanov 
 Broumov 
 Brzice 
 Bukovice 
 Černčice 
 Červená Hora 
 Červený Kostelec 
 Česká Čermná 
 Česká Metuje 
 Česká Skalice 
 Chvalkovice 
 Dolany 
 Dolní Radechová 
 Hejtmánkovice 
 Heřmanice 
 Heřmánkovice 
 Horní Radechová 
 Hořenice 
 Hořičky 
 Hronov 
 Hynčice 
 Jaroměř 
 Jasenná 
 Jestřebí 
 Jetřichov 
 Kramolna 
 Křinice 
 Lhota pod Hořičkami 
 Libchyně 
 Litoboř 
 Machov 
 Martínkovice 
 Mezilečí 
 Mezilesí 
 Meziměstí 
 Nahořany 
 Náchod 
 Nové Město nad Metují 
 Nový Hrádek 
 Nový Ples 
 Otovice 
 Police nad Metují 
 Provodov-Šonov 
 Přibyslav 
 Rasošky 
 Rožnov 
 Rychnovek 
 Říkov 
 Sendraž 
 Šestajovice 
 Slatina nad Úpou 
 Slavětín nad Metují 
 Slavoňov 
 Šonov 
 Stárkov 
 Studnice 
 Suchý Důl 
 Teplice nad Metují 
 Velichovky 
 Velká Jesenice 
 Velké Petrovice 
 Velké Poříčí 
 Velký Třebešov 
 Vernéřovice 
 Vestec 
 Vlkov 
 Vršovka 
 Vysoká Srbská 
 Vysokov 
 Zábrodí 
 Zaloňov 
 Žďár nad Metují 
 Žďárky 
 Žernov

References

External links
 List of towns and villages of the Náchod District
 Transport

 
Districts of the Czech Republic